Findlay is a city in and the county seat of Hancock County, Ohio, United States. The second-largest city in Northwest Ohio, Findlay lies about 40 miles (64 km) south of Toledo. Its population was 40,313 at the 2020 census. The principal city of the Findlay micropolitan area, it is home to the University of Findlay, and the headquarters of Fortune 100 company Marathon Petroleum, which ranks 19th.

History

In the War of 1812, Colonel James Findlay of Cincinnati built a road and a stockade to transport and shelter troops in the Great Black Swamp region.  This stockade was named Fort Findlay in his honor. At the conclusion of the war, the community of Findlay was born. The first town lots were laid out in 1821 by future Ohio Governor Joseph Vance and Elnathan Corry.

Before the Civil War, Findlay was a stop for slaves along the Underground Railroad.

In 1861, David Ross Locke moved to Findlay, where he served as editor for the Hancock Jeffersonian newspaper until he left in 1865. It was in the Hancock Jeffersonian that Locke penned the first of his Nasby letters.

During the 1880s, Findlay was a booming center of oil and natural gas production, though the supply of petroleum had dwindled by the early 20th century.

Findlay hosted the highly competitive Ohio State Music Festival in 1884.  A young cornet player, Warren G. Harding, and his Citizens' Cornet Band of Marion placed third in the competition. Harding went on to be elected the 29th President of the United States.

[[File:Bird's-eye view of Findlay, Ohio Date Created Published- Brooklyn, N.Y. - The Albertype Co. ; c.1906.jpg|thumb|left|390px|Bird's-eye view of Findlay, ;;circa 1906]]

On March 31, 1892, the only known lynching in the history of Hancock County occurred when a mob of 1,000 men, many "respectable citizens", broke into the county jail in Findlay. They lynched Mr. Lytle, who had seriously (but not fatally as believed at the time) injured his wife and two daughters with a hatchet the day before, by hanging him twice (first from the bridge, then a telegraph pole) and finally shooting his body over a dozen times. The authorities had intended to secretly convey the prisoner to a suburb at one o'clock, where a train was to have been taken for Lima, but their plans were frustrated by the mob.

In 1908, American songwriter Tell Taylor wrote the standard, "Down by the Old Mill Stream" while fishing along the Blanchard River in Findlay. The song was published in 1910.

A disaster occurred during the 1936 Independence Day celebration, where a stray firework fell into a crowd, injuring 16 people and attracting national media attention.

For three months in the early 1960s, Findlay had the distinction of being the only community in the world where touch-tone telephone service was available. Touch-tone service was first introduced there on November 1, 1960.

In 2007, a flood that crested at 18.46 feet caused around $100 million in damage. The flood was nearly as strong as the 1913 flood.

Geography

Findlay is located at  (41.042843, −83.642216).

The Blanchard River travels through Findlay, flowing east to west.

Climate

Demographics

2020 census

As of the census of 2020,  40,313 people and 17,550 households were in the city. The [[Race (U.S. Census)|racial makeup of the city was 84.6% White, 2.5% Black, 0.2% Native American, 2.3% Asian, and 3.6% of two or more races. Hispanics or Latinos of any race were 7.9% of the population.

About 20.4% of residents were under 18, and 17.2% were over 65. The gender makeup of the city was 48.2% male and 51.8% female. 

The median household income was $50,921 (in 2021 dollars). Per capita income for the city was $33,411; 13.5% of persons were below the poverty line. 

2010 census
As of the census of 2010, 41,202 people, 17,354 households, and 10,329 families resided in the city. The racial makeup of the city was 91.2% White, 2.2% African American, 0.3% Native American, 2.5% Asian, 1.7% from other races, and 2.1% from two or more races. Hispanics or Latinos of any race were 5.7% of the population.

Of the 17,354 households,28.3% had children under 18 living with them, 43.1% were married couples living together, 11.8% had a female householder with no husband present, 4.6% had a male householder with no wife present, and 40.5% were not families. About 32.6% of all households were made up of individuals, and 10.9% had someone living alone who was 65 or older. The average household size was 2.29, and the average family size was 2.87.

The median age in the city was 35.9 years. The age distribution was 22.2% under 18; 12.9% from 18 to 24; 25.5% from 25 to 44; 25.0% from 45 to 64; and 14.5% were 65 years of age or older. The gender makeup of the city was 47.6% male and 52.4% female.

2000 census
As of the census of 2000,  38,967 people, 15,905 households, and 10,004 families were living in the city. The population density was 2,266.3 people per square mile (875.2/km2). The 17,152 housing units had an average density of 997.6 per square mile (385.2/km2). The racial makeup of the city was 93.7% White, 1.4% African American, 0.19% Native American, 1.76% Asian, 1.69% from other races, and 1.26% from two or more races. Hispanics or Latinos of any race were 3.95% of the population.

Of the 15,905 households, 29.2% had children under 18 living with them, 49.3% were married couples living together, 9.9% had a female householder with no husband present, and 37.1% were not families. Around 30.2% of all households were made up of individuals, and 10.2% had someone living alone who was 65 or older. The average household size was 2.36, and the average family size was 2.93.

In the city, the age distribution was 23.8% under 18, 11.9% from 18 to 24, 28.7% from 25 to 44, 21.4% from 45 to 64, and 14.2% who were 65 or older. The median age was 35 years. For every 100 females, there were 91.3 males. For every 100 females 18 and over, there were 87.9 males.

The median income for a household in the city was $40,883, and for a family was $49,986. Males had a median income of $36,150 versus $23,797 for females. The per capita income for the city was $21,328. About 5.9% of families and 9.1% of the population were below the poverty line, including 11.0% of those under  18 and 6.1% of those 65 or over.

Economy

Findlay is the headquarters of the Cooper Tire & Rubber Company, founded in 1914, which specializes in the design, manufacture, marketing, and sales of replacement automobile and truck tires, and subsidiaries that specialize in medium truck, motorcycle, and racing tires.

Findlay was the longtime headquarters of the Marathon Oil Corporation from 1905 until 1990 when it moved its offices to Houston, Texas. Marathon Petroleum Company, a former subsidiary of Marathon Oil, maintained its main office in Findlay after Marathon Oil moved. On July 1, 2011, Marathon Petroleum became an independent entity, with headquarters in Findlay.

The city's major shopping center is Findlay Village Mall, opened in 1962.

Findlay is home to a Kohl's department store distribution center, which is Kohl's oldest distribution center after the recent closing of the original one in Wisconsin.

Findlay is home to the Whirlpool dishwasher manufacturing plant and distribution center.  This plant is considered to be the largest dishwasher plant in the world (based on production).

Findlay is home to several other major distribution centers, including Best Buy, Lowe's, and Campbell Soup Company.

Largest employers
According to the City of Findlay 2019 Comprehensive Annual Financial Report (CAFR), the following companies are the top employers in the city:

Government

The city is administered by a mayor and a city council. The Findlay City Council is composed of the president of council, seven ward representatives, and three representatives elected at-large. The mayor appoints the director of public safety and service. The people elect the auditor, municipal court clerk, municipal court judges, and the law director. Christina Muryn has been the mayor of Findlay since 2019.

Education
Primary and secondary
Three intermediate (3–5) buildings and three primary (K-2) buildings are within the city of Findlay.

For decades, students attended one of three junior high schools: Donnell (Atoms), Central (Spartans), or Glenwood (Eagles). The original Donnell School building located on Baldwin Avenue was razed in 2012 to make room for the construction of a new building, which began usage in January 2013. Another new school built directly behind the original Glenwood building on North Main Street officially opened and began usage in January 2013. The building known as Central, located on West Main Cross, was originally Findlay's high school (until the current high school was built in 1963). Once the two new middle schools were opened, part of Central was razed, leaving only the auditorium. A new Performing Arts Center (funded mainly by Marathon Petroleum) was constructed by refurbishing and renovating Central's auditorium, finishing in December 2015.

Findlay High School is a comprehensive high school with an enrollment of 1,632 students in grades 9–12. Of the 130 professional staff, 87 have master's degrees or beyond.  Accreditation has been 
granted by AdvancEd Accreditation.

Postsecondary

The city is home to the University of Findlay, a private liberal arts college with an enrollment of over 4,100 students, and Owens Community College, a state school with an enrollment of 2,391 students. The University of Findlay is best known for its programs in Education (undergraduate and Master's) and the equestrian studies programs. Students enrolled in the preveterinary or western equestrian studies have access to a 152-acre farm operated by the university. Those students who are pursuing a degree in English equestrian studies have access to a separate rural facility composed of 32 acres, which includes the University Equine Veterinary Services Inc.

Winebrenner Theological Seminary also makes its home in Findlay, adjacent to the university. Findlay also had a branch location of Brown Mackie College prior to 2017.

Public library
The city has the main branch of the Findlay-Hancock County Public Library. The library was established on April 16, 1888, and was originally housed in the Hancock County Courthouse basement until it was able to move into an old post office building in 1935. The main library building was renovated in 1991, and again in 2009 after a major flood. The library announced in March 2019 it would end the process of charging late fees.

Transportation
Findlay Airport does not have regularly scheduled passenger flights.

Interstate 75, US 68, and US 224 are major highways that pass through the city. State routes in the city of Findlay include: Ohio State Route 12, Ohio State Route 15, Ohio State Route 568, and Ohio State Route 37.

Three major cab companies are based in and operated in and around Findlay and Handcock County. The most notable are Accurate Cab co which went out of business in 2019–2020, USA Cab and Trinity Express Cab. While Black & White Transportation Cab will operate in Findlay, they are based out of Toledo, Ohio.

Historically, the Baltimore & Ohio, the New York Central, and the Nickel Plate Road operated passenger train service through Findlay. The last trains were the Nickel Plate's St. Louis - Muncie - Cleveland trains (#9, Blue Arrow westbound and #10, Blue Dart eastbound). These trains ended in 1959.

Culture
Annual activities

 Springtime in Ohio craft show – May 
 Boogie on Main Street – June
 Riverside Wine festival – June
 Pride in the Park – July
 Flag City BalloonFest – August
 Rib-Off on Broadway – August
 The Hancock County Fair – Labor Day weekend
Oktoberfest – September
 Christmas in October craft show – October
 Findlay | Hancock County Halloween Parade – October

Sports
 The University of Findlay participates in Division II athletics as a member of the Great Midwest Athletic Conference.
 The University of Findlay Men's Basketball team became NCAA Division II National Champions for the 2008–2009 season on March 28, 2009, in Springfield, Massachusetts, capping off a perfect season (36–0).
 From 2006 to 2008, the city was home to the Findlay Freedom, a low level professional ice hockey team.
 Beginning in 2008, the Findlay Grrrowl played Junior A hockey at The Cube Ice Arena at the Hancock Rec Center. In 2009 the Grrrowl won the United Junior Hockey League's only championship beating the Jamestown Jets two games to one.  The UJHL and an attempted successor folded the next year
Findlay was home to minor league baseball. The Findlay Browns was the final nickname of the minor league baseball teams based in Findlay between 1895 and 1941. Findlay teams played as members of the Interstate League in 1895, Buckeye League in 1915 and Ohio State League from 1937 to 1941. The Findlay Browns were an affiliate of the St. Louis Browns in 1937 and 1938.

Notable people

 Peggy Kirk Bell, golfer, winner of the 1949 Titleholders Championship
 Willard Harrison Bennett, inventor of the radio frequency mass spectrometer
 Joshua Brodbeck, international concert organist
 Aaron Craft, college basketball player for Ohio State, Big Ten leader in steals
 Gavin Creel, Tony Award-winning Broadway actor and singer
 Russel Crouse, Broadway playwright, The Sound of Music, State of the Union and Call Me Madam Jo Ann Davidson, Ohio's first female Speaker of the House
 James C. Donnell, president of The Ohio Oil Company (now Marathon Oil)
 Marie Dressler, actress and silent film star
 Tennyson Guyer, Congressman
 Ray Harroun, race car developer and driver, and first Indianapolis 500 winner
 Cliff Hite, Ohio state senator, high school football coach of Ben Roethlisberger
 Michael Holmes, saxophonist
 Josh Huston, former kicker in the National Football League (NFL)
 Grant "Home Run" Johnson, Negro league baseball player and manager
 John Kidd, professional football player (punter) in the NFL
 Dave Laut, shot-putter who won bronze at the 1984 Summer Olympics
 Mark Metcalf, actor
 Marilyn Miller, Broadway star of the 1920s
 William Mungen, U.S. Representative, lawyer, Union Army colonel
 Dan O'Brien, cattleman and author
 Michael G. Oxley, Congressman (1981–2006), co-author of Sarbanes–Oxley Act, Executive Vice President of NASDAQ
 Lamont Paris, men's college basketball coach at University of Tennessee at Chattanooga 
 Tot Pressnell, pitcher for the Brooklyn Dodgers and Chicago Cubs
 James Purdy, novelist, short-story writer, poet, and playwright
 Howard Taylor Ricketts, pathologist who discovered the causative agent of Rocky Mountain spotted fever, Rickettsia rickettsii'', which was also named after him
 Ben Roethlisberger, professional football player in the NFL for the Pittsburgh Steelers
 Philip Sugden, artist and painter
 Tell Taylor, composer of "Down by the Old Mill Stream"
 Landon Tewers, musician known for The Plot In You

References

External links

 
 City of Findlay, Ohio
 www.FindlayHancockED.com
 www.VisitFindlay.com

 
Cities in Ohio
Cities in Hancock County, Ohio
County seats in Ohio
Micropolitan areas of Ohio
Populated places established in 1887
1887 establishments in Ohio